The Atlantic Coast Conference Baseball Pitcher of the Year is a baseball award given to the Atlantic Coast Conference's most outstanding pitcher. The award was first given after the 2005 season.

Key

Winners

Winners by school

Footnotes
 The University of Maryland left the ACC in 2014 to join the Big Ten Conference.

References

NCAA Division I baseball conference players of the year
Pitcher